Valley West Mall is an enclosed super-regional shopping mall in West Des Moines, Iowa. The mall's only anchor store is JCPenney. There is 2 vacant anchor store that were once Younkers and Von Maur

History
Frederick Watson, a developer from Minneapolis, Minnesota, first unveiled plans for Valley West Mall in 1971. The Meredith Corporation initially objected to the mall since it was right next to a site where Meredith planned to build its new corporate headquarters, but Meredith withdrew its plan to relocate there in June 1971. A dispute with Dayton Hudson Corporation over plans to put a Dayton's department store at Valley West Mall also delayed construction. After Davenport-based Petersen Harned Von Maur signed a lease agreement to anchor the mall in mid-1974, Dayton Hudson unsuccessfully sued Watson, claiming it was promised a spot in the mall. The legal battle against Dayton Hudson also led to a delay in signing a third anchor store after Von Maur and Omaha-based Brandeis, as JCPenney refused to sign a lease agreement until the suit was settled. 
Valley West Mall opened August 4, 1975, with about 20 stores and its first anchor, Brandeis. The mall's grand opening ceremony was held on July 28, 1976, with the opening of the second anchor, Petersen Harned Von Maur, and an additional 40 specialty stores. JCPenney, the third anchor, opened in March 1977 to complete the mall.  Brandeis was acquired by Younkers in 1987. Petersen Harned Von Maur changed its name to Von Maur in 1989.  By 2000, Valley West was the Des Moines area's most-visited mall with an average of 40,000 shoppers per day.

Plans for a fourth anchor store at Valley West Mall were announced on two separate occasions but never materialized. In March 1999, Dillard's signed a letter of intent with Watson Centers to build a $30 million store and parking ramp, but the letter of intent expired in August 2000, and Dillard's located in the new Jordan Creek Town Center instead. In May 2001, Galyan's (now Dick's Sporting Goods) announced a plan to build an  anchor store, but by January 2003, it backed out of its plan to enter the Des Moines market. 

While Jordan Creek was under construction, Valley West underwent an interior renovation that was completed in August 2003.

A food court joined the mall in 1998, replacing a vacated Dunham's Sports.

Legal issues
On December 24, 1998, a group of activists passed out handbills outside of Valley West Mall's JCPenney store that accused Phillips-Van Heusen, whose clothing line was sold at JCPenney, of promoting sweatshop conditions. The activists were removed by West Des Moines police and arrested for trespassing. Two of them sued the city of West Des Moines and took their case to the Iowa Supreme Court, arguing that malls like Valley West had become large public gathering places where they had the right to freedom of speech. West Des Moines, on the other hand, argued that Valley West was a private property and the owners would lose control of their property if handbill distribution was allowed. On April 3, 2002, the Iowa Supreme Court ruled in favor of West Des Moines.

Valley West Mall and Merle Hay Mall were plaintiffs in a lawsuit against the city of West Des Moines over the construction of Jordan Creek Town Center. The suit, which claimed that West Des Moines was illegally using tax increment financing money to improve the infrastructure around Jordan Creek, was dismissed by the Iowa Supreme Court on February 27, 2002.

On April 18, 2018 it was announced that Younkers would be closing as the parent, Bon-Ton Stores, was going out of business. The store closed on August 29, 2018.

On August 24, 2021, it was announced that Von Maur will close its store at Valley West Mall in 2022 in favor opening a new one at Jordan Creek Town Center. JCPenney will be its only anchor left.

Anchor
JCPenney

References

External links
 Valley West Mall website

Shopping malls in Iowa
Shopping malls established in 1975
West Des Moines, Iowa